Peerla Panduga is a festival celebrated by Hindus and Muslims in the Telangana State, Rayala Seema region of Andhra Pradesh, India. It is a celebrated across the Sufi shrines called as Ashurkhana. A procession of the relic, called as Alam  is taken out as a part of Muharram. There maybe multiple relics donated by various members of the procession. Some villages in Telangana have relics that have been donated through generation by the members of the same family (Nasarla Palle, Telangana).

References

Festivals in Andhra Pradesh